This is a list of the Northwest Territories Legislative Assemblies dates and legislative sessions from 1870–present. The current capital is Yellowknife since 1967. There have been twenty-seven legislatures since becoming a territory in 1870.

Temporary North-West Council 1870 – 1876
1st Council of the Northwest Territories 1876 – 1888
1st North-West Legislative Assembly 1888 – 1891
2nd North-West Legislative Assembly 1891 – 1894
3rd North-West Legislative Assembly 1894 – 1898
4th North-West Legislative Assembly 1898 – 1902
5th North-West Legislative Assembly 1902 – 1905
2nd Council of the Northwest Territories 1905 – 1951
1st Northwest Territories Legislative Council 1951 – 1954
2nd Northwest Territories Legislative Council 1954 – 1957
3rd Northwest Territories Legislative Council 1957 – 1961
4th Northwest Territories Legislative Council 1961 – 1964
5th Northwest Territories Legislative Council 1964 – 1967
6th Northwest Territories Legislative Council 1967 – 1970
7th Northwest Territories Legislative Council 1970 – 1975
8th Northwest Territories Legislative Assembly 1975 – 1979
9th Northwest Territories Legislative Assembly 1979 – 1983
10th Northwest Territories Legislative Assembly 1983 – 1987
11th Northwest Territories Legislative Assembly 1987 – 1991
12th Northwest Territories Legislative Assembly 1991 – 1995
13th Northwest Territories Legislative Assembly 1995 – 1999
14th Northwest Territories Legislative Assembly 1999 – 2003
15th Northwest Territories Legislative Assembly 2003 – 2007
16th Northwest Territories Legislative Assembly 2007 – 2011
17th Northwest Territories Legislative Assembly 2011 – 2015
18th Northwest Territories Legislative Assembly 2015 – 2019
19th Northwest Territories Legislative Assembly 2019 – present

See also
List of Northwest Territories general elections
History of Northwest Territories capital cities

References 

Northwest Territories Legislative Assemblies
Legislative Assemblies